Alțâna is a commune in the north of Sibiu County, Romania, in the historical region of Transylvania. It is composed of three villages: Alțâna, Benești (Bägendorf; Bendorf) and Ghijasa de Sus (Obergesäß; Felsőgezés).

Alțâna was one of the most important villages of the Transylvanian Saxon seat of Nocrich.

History
In 1910 the Agnita to Sibiu railway line was completed with at station at Alțâna and Benești; however, the line was closed in 2001. An active restoration group has since been formed aiming to restore the entire line to working condition.

Name 
The legend says that the first German villagers were led by ten "greavi". These ten men counseled in the matter of how should they name the settlement and each of them wanted to use their name. In the end, they decided to name it Alzen, which means "all ten".

Natives 
 Adolf Gottschling (1841-1918), a professor at the Brukenthal College in Sibiu and one of the pioneers of meteorology in Transylvania

References

Communes in Sibiu County
Localities in Transylvania